The 1932–33 Segunda División season saw 10 teams participate in the second flight Spanish league. Real Oviedo was promoted to Primera División. Castellón was relegated to Tercera División.

Teams

Final table

Results

External links
LFP website

Segunda División seasons
2
Spain